Cool Change is a 1986 Australian action film directed by George T. Miller. It stars Jon Blake and Lisa Armytage.

Plot
A park ranger is caught in a conflict between farmers and conservationists.

Cast
Jon Blake as Steve
Lisa Armytage as Joanna
Deborra-Lee Furness as Lee
David Bradshaw as James Hardwicke
Alec Wilson as Bull Raddick

Production
The film was shot on location in Mansfield and the Victorian Alps.

Critical reception
The critic from the Sydney Morning Herald called the movie "a spectacularly simplistic propaganda piece for the cattle farmers of the Victorian high plains".

Box office
 Cool Change grossed $60,868 at the box office in Australia, which is equivalent to $132,692 in 2009 dollars.

References

External links

Cool Change at Oz Movies
Cool Change at TCMDB
Cool Change at Screen Australia

Australian action films
1986 films
Films directed by George T. Miller
1980s English-language films
1980s Australian films